Keld is a village in the English county of North Yorkshire. It is in Swaledale, in the district of Richmondshire and the Yorkshire Dales National Park.  The name derives from the Viking word Kelda meaning a spring and the village was once called Appletre Kelde – the spring near the apple trees.

Keld is the crossing point of the Coast to Coast Walk and the Pennine Way long-distance footpaths at the head of Swaledale, and marks the end of the Swale Trail, a 20 km mountain bike trail which starts in Reeth.  At the height of the lead-mining industry in Swaledale in the late 19th century, several notable buildings – now Grade II listed – were erected: they include the Congregational and Methodist chapels, the school and the Literary Institute.

A tea room and small shop operate at Park Lodge from Easter to autumn.  Out of season, local volunteers provide a self service café for visitors in the village’s Public Hall.  Keld’s Youth Hostel closed in 2008 and has since reopened as Keld Lodge, a hotel with bar and restaurant. There is a series of four waterfalls close to Keld in a limestone gorge on the River Swale:  Kisdon Force, East Gill Force, Catrake Force and Wain Wath Force.

Keld Resource Centre
The Keld Resource Centre, a local charity, is restoring a series of listed buildings in the village centre and returning them to community use.  The first phase involved restoring the Manse, the minister's house attached to the United Reformed Church, which was completed in 2009 and is now used as a holiday cottage, proceeds from which support the Centre's work.

In 2010 the Centre created the Keld Well-being Garden in the chapel churchyard.  It provides a quiet spot for visitors to contemplate their well-being in the beautiful natural environment of Upper Swaledale.

The Keld Countryside and Heritage Centre opened in 2011; it provides interpretation of the countryside, buildings and social history of Keld, and displays of artefacts relevant to Upper Swaledale.  It is open throughout the year, operating alongside The Upper Room which is used for meetings, exhibitions, workshops and social events.  A range of guided walks, exhibitions, talks and other activities take place during the summer months.

Further projects will involve restoring Keld’s former school.

Crackpot Hall
There may have been a building on this site since the 16th century when a hunting lodge was maintained for Thomas, the first Baron Wharton, who visited the Dale occasionally to shoot the red deer. Survey work by the Yorkshire Dales National Park Authority has shown that the building has changed many times over the years. At one time it even had a heather or "ling" thatched roof.
 
The current ruin is of a farmhouse dating from the mid 18th century. It was an impressive two-storey building with a slate roof and matching "shippons" or cowsheds at each end for animals. The building may also have been used as mine offices, as intensive lead mining was carried out in the area, and there were violent disputes over mine boundaries in the 18th century.

In the 1930s Ella Pontefract and Marie Hartley wrote of a wild 4-year-old child named Alice. On 7 November 2015, BBC Radio 3 broadcast a documentary about the story in the Between the Ears strand titled Alice at Crackpot Hall.

The current building was abandoned in the 1950s because of subsidence. Crackpot Hall has been saved from further decay by Gunnerside Estate with the aid of grants from the Millennium Commission and European Union through the Yorkshire Dales Millennium Trust.

The name Crackpot is said to mean "a deep hole or chasm that is a haunt of crows".

References

External links 

Keld Lodge

Villages in North Yorkshire
Swaledale